Changeless could refer to:

Changeless (album), a 1988 live album by American pianist Keith Jarrett
Changeless (novel), a 2010 steampunk novel by American author Gail Carriger